Ayameike Station (菖蒲池駅) is a railway station on Kintetsu Railway's Nara Line in Nara, Japan.

Line
Nara Line (Station number: A21)

Building
The station has 2 platforms and 2 tracks.

Surroundings
The former site of the Kintetsu Ayameike Amusement Park (closed on June 6, 2004)
Kinki University Elementary School
Kinki University Kindergarten
Herves Ayameike
Cospa Ayameike
HANA
Iris Water Terrace Ayameike

Adjacent stations

One rapid express train for Nara stops at this station on school days of Kinki University Elementary School and Kinki University Kindergarten (departing at 8:29).

References

External links
Tourist website of Kintetsu

Railway stations in Japan opened in 1923
Railway stations in Nara Prefecture
Buildings and structures in Nara, Nara